Fred Berry (1951–2003) was an American actor and dancer.

Fred Berry may also refer to:

Fred Berry (ice hockey) (born 1956), Canadian ice hockey player
Fred Berry (cricketer) (1910–1989), English cricketer
Fred T. Berry (1887–1933), American naval commander
Fred Berry (politician) (1949–2018), American politician and disability activist

See also
Fred Barry (disambiguation)
Fred Perry (disambiguation)